The 2008 UCI Cyclo-cross World Championships took place in Treviso, Italy on the weekend of January 26 and January 27, 2008. As 2007, four events were scheduled.

Medal table

Medal summary

External links

UCI website

 
Uci Cyclo-cross World Championships, 2008
Cyclo-cross
UCI Cyclo-cross World Championships
International cycle races hosted by Italy
January 2008 sports events in Europe